Mountain Fair is a summer arts and music fair held annually in Sopris Park in Carbondale, Colorado. It has been held annually during the last weekend of July since 1972. Each year between 15,000 and 20,000 people attend the event over the course of the three days that it is held. The event's sponsoring organization is Carbondale Arts, a non-profit organization supporting the arts in Carbondale.

History 
Mountain Fair was started by Laurie Loeb as part of Colorado's state Chautauqua in 1972. Booth displays included Native American weavings and local Boy Scouts sold seed and corn necklaces. Former fair director Thomas Lawley, was the fairs longest time director to date, having held the position for 17 years. The current director of the fair is Amy Kimberly, who has had the position since 2004. She is also the executive director of Carbondale Arts. Over the years, the event has grown in size and popularity.

Due to the COVID-19 pandemic a regular fair was not held in 2020. Instead a revised event was held, where musical acts performed from a flatbed truck that drove through town. Additionally on the last day of the event, the local venue Steves Guitars hosted a virtual livestreamed concert.

Events 
Mountain Fair has many contests and competitions, such as the Wood Splitting Competition, Limbo Contest and Fly-Casting Competition which are held each year. There are also two contests for Pie and Cake Baking.

For many years the Dance of the Sacred Fire was held at night annually. In 2018 however, due to stage 2 fire restrictions in the area, there was no fire involved in the dance and aerialists performed instead. Since then it has no longer been held.

One of the first events held at Mountain Fair each year is the Rhythm of the Heart Community Drum Circle. It has been led by Laurie Loeb for more than ten years and has more than 400 participants each year.

The event also features many musicians and musical groups, many of which are local to the area around Carbondale. Some local acts include Kan'Nal who performed in 2005 and Elephant Revival who performed in 2011 which are both Colorado based bands. Over the years there have also been many notable musical acts and bands that have performed. In 2005 the three time Grammy award nominated (two time nominated in 2005) band Blue Highway performed. In 2009 the two time Grammy winning band Brave Combo performed. In 2013 the Colombian musical group La Sonora Dinamita performed. In 2017, the musical group MarchFourth Marching Band performed. In 2018 the band Down North performed. Many of the events and music are broadcast live on local Carbondale radio station KDNK, which can be heard on the radio in the area as well as through a stream on their website.

All vendors must use only zero waste supplies, while the Green Team, which has volunteers stationed at stations with compost, recycling and landfill bins during the event each year, has had a 90%+ landfill diversion rate for over 10 years.

References 

Annual fairs
Garfield County, Colorado
Festivals established in 1972